Lawrie Tatum (May 16, 1822 in Mullica Hill, New Jersey - January 22, 1900 in Springdale, Iowa) was a Quaker who was best known as an Indian Agent to the Kiowa and Comanche tribes at Fort Sill agency in Indian Territory.

He was born to Quaker parents George and Lydia Tatum near Mullica Hill, New Jersey in 1822 and moved to Goshen, Ohio in 1831 followed by a move to Cedar County, Iowa in 1844.

When President Ulysses S. Grant's "Peace Policy" concerning U.S. policy with Native American tribes went into effect, officials of the Society of Friends (Quakers) met with Grant and requested members of their organization be assigned as Indian agents. This led to the "Quaker Policy"; replacing corrupt agents in the Indian Bureau with Quakers, which was later expanded to include other religious denominations. On July 1, 1869, Tatum began his duties "acting in the capacity of governor, legislature, judge, sheriff and accounting officer" for the Kiowa and Comanche Agency at Fort Sill in the Indian Territory.

Tatum was known to the Kiowa and Comanche tribes as Pot-ta-wat Pervo (Bald Head Agent). While acting as Indian agent, Tatum secured the release of many white and Mexican captives, including the family of Gottfried Koozer, whose wife and five children were kidnapped by Chief White Horse of the Kiowa.

Tatum resigned as an Indian agent for the Comanche, Kiowa, and Wichita Reservation on March 31, 1873 with James M. Haworth appointed as his successor. Lawrie Tatum's departure precipitated partly to his opposition and protest for the release of Satanta and the Kiowa chief's participation in the Warren Wagon Train raid of 1871.

In 1884, he was appointed guardian to future United States president Herbert Hoover and Hoover's brother Theodore and sister Mary after the death of their mother.

Having worked closely with American Indians and President Ulysses S. Grant, Tatum wrote an account of Grant's Peace Policy, entitled, Our red brothers and the peace policy of President Ulysses S. Grant, first published in 1899.

References

Bibliography
 
 
 
 
 
 
 

1822 births
1900 deaths
American Quakers
People from Harrison Township, New Jersey
People from Cedar County, Iowa
Herbert Hoover
19th-century Quakers
People from Clermont County, Ohio
United States Indian agents